Fatima Mata National College is a college in the Indian state of Kerala, named after Our Lady of Fatima, a Catholic title of Virgin Mary. The college was ranked 92nd in India by the National Institutional Ranking Framework in 2022.

Rankings

Fatima Mata National College was ranked 92 among colleges in India by the National Institutional Ranking Framework (NIRF) in 2022.

Motto
The school's motto is per matrem pro patria (through the mother for the fatherland).

History 

The college was founded in 1951 by Jerome M. Fernandez Thuppasseril, the first native Bishop of Quilon. The college was formally inaugurated on 29 December 1952 by Norman  Cardinal Gilroy, Papal Legate to India.

Fatima was elevated to the status of a first grade college with the introduction of degree courses in Commerce, Economics and Zoology. This was followed by the introduction of courses in Botany, Chemistry, Mathematics and Physics. Physical resources were added in the form of hostels, sports pavilion, chemistry block, auditorium, playgrounds, an NCC office, hockey stadium, language lab, basketball courts, a botany garden, computer labs and research centres.

Principals
 Msgr. Joseph Kureethadom, 1951–1952
 Fr. Mathew Kottiath, 1952–1960, 1965–1969
 Fr. C. M. George, 1960–1965
 Msgr. A. J. Rozario, 1969–1984
 Rev. Richard P. Fernandez, 1984–1988
 Fr. (now Bishop) Stanley Roman, 1988–1996
 Prof. K. Napoleon, 1996–1997
 Dr. G. Henry, 1997–2004
 Prof. C. K. Felix, 2004–2006
 Dr. Sr. Soosamma Kavumpurath, 2006–2015
 Dr. Vincent B. Netto, 2015–2021
 Dr Jojo P.J., 2021-2022
 Dr Cynthia.M.Catherine , 2022-

Managers
 Msgr. Victor Fernandez, 1951–952
 Msgr. Bernard D'cruz, 1952–1965
 Msgr. Peter Thekkevilayil, 1965–1974
 Fr. Alphonse Thundil, 1976–1984
 Msgr. A. J. Rozario, 1984–2006
 Fr. Anil Jose, 2006–2022
 Fr. Abhilash Gregory, 2022–present

Timeline
 1961 Start of postgraduate courses in Botany and Commerce, followed by courses in Physics, Zoology, Economics, English, Psychology, Chemistry and Polymer Chemistry, Travel and Tourism Management, Malayalam, Mathematics.
 1966-1967 Open-access library and auditorium opened.
 1980 St. Joseph’s Guidance and Counselling Centre opened.
 1984 Centre for Research and Post Graduate Studies opened.
 1997–1998 Computer labs opened in the Departments of Mathematics and Commerce.
 1998 Upgrade of the Department of Zoology to a Research Centre, followed by the Department of Commerce the following year.
 1999 Language Laboratory for English and hockey stadium opened.
 2000 Golden Jubilee celebrations.
 2001 Accreditation by NAAC at Four Star level.
 2001–2002 The Institute of Distance Education degree courses started.
 2005–2006 The Departments of Economics and English were elevated to Research Centres.
 2007 NAAC Reaccreditation (B++).
 2013 NAAC reaccredited with “A” Grade.
 2019 Ranked 83 by NIRF.
 2020 NAAC Re-Accredited A Grade.

Notable alumni

Notable alumni include:
 Justice Raja Vijayaraghavan V.
 Eugene Pandala (1971), architect
 Balachandra Menon (1970), actor, director, script writer, lyricist, and producer & lawyer
 K. P. A. C. Sunny, actor
 Suresh Gopi (1980), film actor, television anchor
 N.K Premachandran, Politician N. K. Premachandran
 James Albert, Indian script writer
 Chavara Parukutty Amma, Indian artist
 Kundara Johnny, Indian actor
 Chandni (Malayalam actress)
 M B Suresh Babu, Olympian
 Dr. A. V. George, Member, Kerala State Commission for Backward Classes (public service)
 J. Alexander (politician) IAS, Former Chief Secretary to the Government of Karnataka

Popular culture
Masterpiece (2017 film) shooting took place in Fatima Mata National College, Kollam

See also 
 Educational Institutions in Kollam District

References

External links
 

Catholic universities and colleges in India
Colleges affiliated to the University of Kerala
Arts and Science colleges in Kerala
Universities and colleges in Kollam
Educational institutions established in 1951
1951 establishments in India